Zebra Imaging was a company that developed 3D digital holographic images, hologram imagers and interactive 3D displays for government and commercial uses. The company offers digital holograms that are autostereoscopic (no glasses or goggles required), full-parallax (viewing of the image from viewpoints above and below as well as from side to side) and in monochrome or full-color.  They have also developed a 3D Dynamic Display, which is capable of rendering holograms in real time; design work with 3D programs such as SketchUp and 123D Catch can be viewed on a holographic display while they are actively being edited.

History 

Zebra Imaging was founded in 1996 by graduates of the Massachusetts Institute of Technology’s Media Laboratory. Its technology was based in-part on work done at the MIT Media Laboratory’s Spatial Imaging Group under the direction of the late holography pioneer, Prof. Stephen Benton.

In 2017, Zebra Imaging announced the sale of its 3D Holographic Print Assets to HoloTech Switzerland AG.

Technology 

The company has been granted over 40 patents with others pending in the U.S. and abroad. Zebra Imaging's 3D digital holographic technology presents multiple perspectives of an image simultaneously and independently to all viewers. The imagery in the static holograms can be subdivided into channels to show short animations or peel-away and overlay views. Since 2005, Zebra Imaging has been developing dynamic (motion-capable) 3D display technology, supported in-part by DARPA (Defense Advanced Research Projects Agency). In November 2011 Zebra's dynamic ZScape display was selected among Time Magazine's "50 Most Important Inventions of 2011."

Funding 
In 2006, it completed a $5.9 million Series C round of funding led by Voyager Capital.

In 2013, the company raised $3.9 million financing collected from 11 investors.

See also
 Digital holography
 Hogel
 Holography
 List of companies based in Austin, Texas
 MIT Media Lab
 Volumetric display

References

Notes 
 Zebra Imaging products at NVIDIA GTC 2009 captured on YouTube. 
 Zebra Imaging affect of holograms on the auto design industry. 
 Zebra Imaging use of NVIDIA GPUs.

External links 
 Zebra Imaging Home Page with links to 3D dynamic display and hologram imager information: www.zebraimaging.com

Companies established in 1996
Companies based in Austin, Texas
Display technology companies
Holography industry